Henryk Bolesta (born 20 September 1957 in Poland) is a Polish retired footballer.

References

Polish footballers
Poland international footballers
Association football goalkeepers
1957 births
Living people